Patricio Martín D'Amico (born 10 February 1975) is an Argentine football manager who is analyst of Marseille.

Career

Playing career

D'Amico started his career with Argentine second division side All Boys, where he made 69 league appearances and scored 20 goals. In 1997, D'Amico signed for Racing in the Argentine top flight. Before the second half of 1997–98, he signed for Argentine second division club Quilmes. In 1998, he signed for Badajoz in the Spanish second division. In 1999, D'Amico signed for Argentine team Belgrano (Córdoba). In 2000, he signed for Metz in the French Ligue 1. 

In 2003, he signed for French second division outfit Châteauroux, helping them qualify for the 2004–05 UEFA Cup and reach the final of the 2003–04 Coupe de France. In 2008, D'Amico signed for Pavia in the Italian third division, becoming the first foreign captain in their history. In 2010, he signed for Italian fourth division side Vogherese.

Managerial career

In 2012, he was appointed manager of Deportivo Maldonado in Uruguay. In 2016, D'Amico was appointed manager of Italian fifth division club Accademia Pavese. In 2018, he was appointed manager of Pavia in the Italian fourth division. In 2019, he was appointed assistant manager of Paraguayan club River Plate (Asunción). In 2021, D'Amico was appointed analyst of Marseille in the French Ligue 1.

Personal life

He is the twin brother of former footballer Fernando D'Amico.

References

External links
 

Argentine footballers
Argentine expatriate footballers
Argentine football managers
Living people
1975 births
Argentine expatriate sportspeople in Spain
Argentine expatriate sportspeople in Italy
Argentine expatriate sportspeople in Paraguay
Argentine expatriate sportspeople in Uruguay
Expatriate footballers in Italy
Expatriate footballers in Spain
Association football midfielders
Ligue 1 players
Ligue 2 players
Argentine Primera División players
Serie C players
Serie D players
FC Metz players
Wasquehal Football players
LB Châteauroux players
All Boys footballers
Deportivo Maldonado managers
Uruguayan Segunda División managers
Serie D managers
A.S.D. AVC Vogherese 1919 players
Racing Club de Avellaneda footballers
CD Badajoz players
Quilmes Atlético Club footballers
Club Atlético Belgrano footballers
Primera Nacional players
Segunda División players
A.C. Legnano players
Expatriate footballers in France
Argentine expatriate sportspeople in France
Footballers from Buenos Aires